Franck is both a surname and a masculine given name. Notable people with the name include:

Surname
 Alfons Franck, Belgian chess master
 César Franck (1822–1890), Belgian composer of the Romantic era
 Eduard Franck (1817–1893), German composer of the Romantic era
 George Franck (1918–2011), American football player
 Dom George Franck (c.1690–1760) French composer and organist
 Harry A. Franck (1881–1962), travel writer
 James Franck (1882–1964), German physicist and Nobel laureate
 Johann Franck (1618–1677), German poet and hymn-writer
 Julia Franck (born 1970) German writer
 Kaj Franck (1911–1989), Finnish designer
 Kasper Franck (1543–1584), German theologian
 Kevin Franck (born 1982), Belgian football player
 Louis Franck (disambiguation), multiple people
 Mathilde Franck (1866–1956), French aviator
 Melchior Franck (1579–1639), German composer of the very early Baroque era
 Mikko Franck (born 1979), Finnish conductor
 Richard Franck (1858–1938), German pianist, composer and teacher.
 Sebastian Franck (1499–c.1543), German humanist and reformer

Given name
 Franck de Almeida (born 1983), Brazilian marathon athlete  
 Franck Amsallem (born 1961), French jazz pianist, arranger, composer and singer
 Franck Atsou (born 1978), Togolese footballer 
 Frank Adisson (born 1969), French slalom canoer and Olympian 
 Franck Avitabile (born 1971), French jazz pianist 
 Franck Azzopardi (born 1970), French footballer 
 Franck Badiou (born 1967), French sports shooter and Olympian
 Franck Belot (born 1972), French rugby union player
 Franck Béria (born 1983), French footballer 
 Franck Bernhard (born 1976), French footballer 
 Franck Berrier (1984–2021), French footballer
 Franck Biancheri (1961–2012), French politician
 Franck Biancheri (born 1960), Monegasque businessman and politician
 Franck Boidin (born 1972), French fencer and Olympian
 Franck Boli (born 1993), Ivorian footballer
 Franck Bouyer (born 1974), French road bicycle racer
 Franck David (born 1970), French sailor and Olympian 
 Franck Delhem (1936–2020), Belgian fencer and Olympian
 Franck Dja Djédjé (born 1986), Ivorian footballer 
 Franck Ducheix (born 1962), French fencer and Olympian  
 Franck Dumas (born 1968), French footballer and manager 
 Franck Dumoulin (born 1973), French pistol shooter and Olympian
 Franck Durix (born 1965), French footballer 
 Franck Engonga (born 1993), Gabonese footballer
 Franck Esposito (born 1971), French swimmer and Olympian
 Franck Essomba (born 1987), Cameroonian footballer 
 Franck Etoundi (born 1990), Cameroonian footballer 
 Franck Fréon (born 1962), French motor racing driver
 Franck Fisseux (born 1985), French archer and Olympian
 Franck Gava (born 1970), French footballer 
 Franck Gilard (born 1950), French politician
 Franck Goddio (born 1947), French archaeologist 
 Franck Goldnadel (born 1969), French public servant and aerospace engineer 
 Franck Grandel (born 1978), Guadeloupean footballer
 Franck R. Havenner (1882–1967), American politician
 Franck Histilloles (born 1973), French footballer 
 Franck Iacono (born 1966), French swimmer and Olympian
 Franck Julien (born 1966), French businessman 
 Franck Junillon (born 1978), French handballer and Olympian 
 Franck Jurietti (born 1975), French footballer 
 Franck Khalfoun (born 1968), French film director 
 Franck Lagorce (born 1968), French motor racing driver
 Franck Lambert (born 1960), French sprint canoer and Olympian 
 Franck Langolff (1949–2006), French composer and guitarist
 Franck Lavaud (1903–1986), Haitian military general and politician
 Franck Leboeuf (born 1968), French footballer
 Franck Lenormand (born 1931), French cyclist and Olympian
 Franck Madou (born 1987), Ivorian footballer
 Franck Mailleux (born 1985), French motor racing driver 
 Franck Montagny (born 1978), French motor racing driver
 Franck Muller (born 1958), Swiss watchmaker
 Franck Perera (born 1984), French motor racing driver
 Franck Piccard (born 1965), French Alpine skier and Olympian
 Franck Pourcel (1913–2000), French conductor
 Franck Ribéry (born 1983), French footballer
 Franck Sauzée (born 1965), French footballer and manager
 Franck Tabanou (born 1989), French footballer
 Franck Thilliez (born 1973), French writer
 Franck Vandecasteele (born 1967), French footballer

Germanic-language surnames
German-language surnames
Jewish surnames
Masculine given names
French masculine given names